The 1963–64 Duke Blue Devils men's basketball team represented Duke University. The head coach was Vic Bubas. The team played its home games in the Cameron Indoor Stadium in Durham, North Carolina, and was a member of the Atlantic Coast Conference.

Schedule

Awards and honors

Team players drafted into the NBA

References

External links
Statistical Database- Duke Blue Devils Basketball Statistical Database

Duke Blue Devils
Duke Blue Devils men's basketball seasons
NCAA Division I men's basketball tournament Final Four seasons
Duke
1963 in sports in North Carolina
1964 in sports in North Carolina